Agamemnon Gratzios or Gratsios (28 February 1922 – 11 August 1993) was a Hellenic Army officer who rose to the rank of full General, and held the posts of Chief of the Hellenic Army General Staff and of the Hellenic National Defence General Staff.

He was born in the village of Elafotopos, Zagori in the Ioannina Prefecture, in 1922. He entered the Hellenic Military Academy, but the outbreak of the Greco-Italian War on 28 October 1940 interrupted his studies; along with his classmates, he participated in the Battle of Crete, where he was seriously wounded. In 1942 he was named a second lieutenant. During the Greek Civil War, he served as a platoon, company and battery commander, being promoted to lieutenant (1946) and captain (1948). He was again wounded during the Battle of Naousa in April 1949. Gratzios was an artillery officer, but after the civil war, he was trained in special operations in Greece and Germany and held several command and staff positions in the Greek Special Forces: commander of the Paratroopers School, of the 5th Raider Squadron, of the Special Forces in Cyprus (in 1965–67). He also commanded the 12th Infantry Division, the ASDEN and III Army Corps, and First Army, being successively promoted to major (1952), lieutenant colonel (1958), colonel (1967), brigadier (1971), major general (1972) and lieutenant general (1974). On 14 September 1976 he assumed the position of Chief of the Army Command, which a year later was reconstituted again as the Hellenic Army General Staff, a post he held until 11 January 1980, when he was appointed as Chief of the Hellenic National Defence General Staff and promoted to full general. He finally retired on 19 January 1982.

He died in 1993.

References 

1922 births
1993 deaths
Hellenic Army generals
Chiefs of the Hellenic Army General Staff
Recipients of the Cross of Valour (Greece)
Greek military personnel of World War II
Chiefs of the Hellenic National Defence General Staff
Greek military personnel of the Greek Civil War
People from Zagori